WAMO may refer to:

 WAMO (AM), a radio station (660 AM) licensed to Wilkinsburg, Pennsylvania, United States
 WAOB (AM), a radio station (860 AM) licensed to Millvale, Pennsylvania, which used the call sign WAMO from 1956 until 2009
 WAOB-FM, a radio station (106.7 FM) licensed to Beaver Falls, Pennsylvania, which used the call sign WAMO-FM from 1960 until 2009
 Warner Advanced Media Operations (WAMO), a division of WEA Manufacturing

See also
 Guamo language, an extinct language also known as Wamo
 Wham-O
 Waymo